Elizabeth Field  is a public use airport located on Fishers Island, in Suffolk County, New York, United States. It is owned by the Town of Southold. According to the FAA's National Plan of Integrated Airport Systems for 2009-2013, Elizabeth Field is classified as a general aviation airport.

Located on the western end of Fishers Island, the airfield saw military use during World War II as part of Fort H. G. Wright.

Facilities and aircraft 
It has two asphalt paved runways: 12/30 is 2,328 by 100 feet (710 x 30 m) and 7/25 is 1,792 by 75 feet (546 x 23 m).

For the 12-month period ending September 27, 2007, the airport had 2,125 aircraft operations, an average of 177 per month: 52% air taxi, 47% general aviation and 1% military. At that time there were 6 aircraft based at this airport: 67% single-engine and 33% multi-engine.

References

External links 
 Videos of landings at Elizabeth Field (0B8): July 2005 and September 2005
 Aerial photo as of 12 April 1991 from USGS The National Map
  from New York State DOT
 
 

Airports in Suffolk County, New York